The following highways are numbered 354:

Canada
Manitoba Provincial Road 354
 Nova Scotia Route 354
Prince Edward Island Route 354
 Quebec Route 354
Saskatchewan Highway 354

Hungary
 Main road 354 (Hungary)

Japan
 Japan National Route 354

United States
  Arkansas Highway 354
  Connecticut Route 354
  Georgia State Route 354
  Kentucky Route 354
  Maryland Route 354
  Montana Secondary Highway 354
 New York:
  New York State Route 354
 County Route 354 (Albany County, New York)
 Ohio State Route 354 (former)
  Puerto Rico Highway 354
  Tennessee State Route 354
  Texas State Highway 354
  Virginia State Route 354
  Wyoming Highway 354